That Certain Thing is a 1928 silent film comedy directed by Frank Capra.  It was Capra's first film for Harry Cohn's Columbia Pictures.

Plot
Molly Kelly (Viola Dana) intends to marry a millionaire. When she meets Andy Charles, Jr. (Ralph Graves), heir to a restaurant fortune, she sees her chance and marries him. Upon discovering the marriage, Andy's father (Burr McIntosh) becomes irate and disinherits his son. Andy attempts life as a ditch-digger to support his wife, but the results are not what he had hoped for.

Cast
 Viola Dana as Molly Kelly  
 Ralph Graves as Andy B. Charles, Jr.  
 Burr McIntosh as A.B. Charles, Sr.  
 Aggie Herring as Maggie Kelly  
 Carl Gerard as Secretary Brooks  
 Syd Crossley as Valet

Preservation status
Prints survive in the Library of Congress Packard Campus collection, George Eastman House Motion Picture Collection, UCLA Film and Television Archives, National Archives of Canada(Ottawa), and the Cineteca Del Friuli(Gemona).

References

External links
That Certain Thing at IMDb.com

1928 films
American black-and-white films
Columbia Pictures films
1928 comedy films
Films directed by Frank Capra
American silent feature films
Silent American comedy films
1920s American films